Attiya Waris (born 25 October 1974) is a Kenyan professor at the University of Nairobi and a writer about financing development from diverse perspectives including illicit financial flows and corporate tax reform.

Life
Waris was born in on 25 October 1974. She earned her first degree at the University of Nairobi. She speaks English, Waris took her master's degrees in 2002 at the University of London and in 2004 at the University of Pretoria. Her doctorate in Tax Law was awarded by Lancaster University in 2009 following a thesis on "Solving the Fiscal Crisis: Re-legitimising the Fiscal State through the Realisation of Human Rights A Case Study of the Kenyan Constituency Development Fund" supervised by Sol Picciotto. From 2007 to 2013, she was vice-chair of the 

Waris is an expert on tax avoidance and she appeared in the documentary film The Spider's Web: Britain's Second Empire.

In 2013 she co-authored a book on "Tax Justice".

The Irish Times quoted her opinions in 2019 when Apple were order to pay $13 billion in avoided tax to the Irish government by the European Commission in 2016. Waris argued that human rights were being ignored given that the Irish government were appealing the decision and to allow Apple to avoid a lower corporate tax rate. Waris said the “People are so busy not watching information and too busy entertaining themselves. The lower tax rate was creating an environment in which countries like Kenya could not compete because Ireland was offering Apple tax rates that were below the cost of supplying service to the company. She argues that Ireland's tax authorities are run by the upper classes who have forgotten the plight of their country's poor.

References

1974 births
Living people
Academic staff of the University of Nairobi
Tax lawyers